Beatriz "Bia" Zaneratto João (born 17 December 1993), sometimes known as just Beatriz or Bia, is a Brazilian professional footballer who plays for Palmeiras and the Brazil national team. She participated in the 2011, 2015, and 2019 editions of the FIFA Women's World Cup.

Club career
Bia Zaneratto joined her local team Ferroviária at the age of 13. In 2010, she moved to play for reigning Copa Libertadores Femenina champions Santos. In February 2013 Bia Zaneratto and her Vitória das Tabocas teammate Thaísinha announced that they had accepted a transfer to South Korean club Incheon Hyundai Steel Red Angels. With the team, Beatriz has won seven consecutive WK League championships between 2013 and 2019. In the 2015 championship, she scored an equalizing goal in the 123rd minute to force the game to penalty shoot-out, where her team prevailed.

From 2020 to 2021, she played for Chinese league Wuhan Jianghan University, where she scored seven goals in 9 matches to help them win the 2020 Chinese Women's Super League.

International career
Ahead of the inaugural 2008 FIFA U-17 Women's World Cup, a 14-year-old Bia Zaneratto was the youngest player in Brazil's squad and was highlighted as a "player to watch" by The New Zealand Herald newspaper.

In May 2011, she made her debut for the senior national team in a 3–0 friendly win over Chile at Estádio Rei Pelé in Maceió. Bia Zaneratto was named in Brazil's squad for the 2011 FIFA Women's World Cup in Germany and participated in the 3–0 group stage win over Equatorial Guinea.

In February 2015, Bia Zaneratto's club commitments in South Korea meant she was left out of Brazil's 18-month residency programme intended to prepare the national team for the 2015 FIFA Women's World Cup and the 2016 Rio Olympics. At the World Cup in Canada, Bia Zaneratto made substitute appearances in the final group game, a 1–0 win over Costa Rica, and the 1–0 second-round defeat by Australia.

Bia Zaneratto was named to the Brazil squad for the 2016 Summer Olympics, her first Olympic Games. She plundered three goals, including one in the Bronze Medal match, in which Brazil lost 2–1 to Canada, as hosts Brazil finished in fourth place. It was reported that her performances "lit up" the Games and made her a target for clubs in the American National Women's Soccer League, albeit her relatively high salary in South Korea made a transfer less likely.

At the 2019 SheBelieves Cup, Bia Zaneratto suffered a fractured fibula during Brazil's 1–0 defeat by hosts the United States in Tampa, Florida.

International goals
Scores and results list Brazil's goal tally first.

Honours

Club 
Santos

 Copa Libertadores Femenina: 2010
Campeonato Paulista de Futebol Feminino: 2010

Hyundai Steel Red Angels

 WK League: 2013, 2014, 2015, 2016, 2017, 2018, 2019

Wuhan Jianghan University

 Chinese Women's Super League: 2020

International 
Brazil

 Copa América Femenina: 2018

Individual 

 WK League Top scorer: 2017
 WK League Top assists: 2017

References

External links

 
 
 

Brazilian women's footballers
Women's association football forwards
Brazilian expatriate sportspeople in South Korea
Expatriate women's footballers in South Korea
WK League players
Brazil women's international footballers
Brazilian expatriate women's footballers
2011 FIFA Women's World Cup players
2015 FIFA Women's World Cup players
2019 FIFA Women's World Cup players
Footballers at the 2016 Summer Olympics
Santos FC (women) players
Associação Ferroviária de Esportes (women) players
Olympic footballers of Brazil
Incheon Hyundai Steel Red Angels WFC players
1993 births
Living people
People from Araraquara
Sociedade Esportiva Palmeiras (women) players
Footballers at the 2020 Summer Olympics
Footballers from São Paulo (state)
Associação Acadêmica e Desportiva Vitória das Tabocas players
Pan American Games medalists in football
Footballers at the 2011 Pan American Games
Pan American Games silver medalists for Brazil
Medalists at the 2011 Pan American Games
FIFA Century Club